Remidus E. Kissassi is a Tanzanian politician and one of five Tanzanian members of the African Union's Pan-African Parliament.

References

Year of birth missing (living people)
Living people
Members of the Pan-African Parliament from Tanzania